The Rya Tunnel ( or ) is a subsea road tunnel in Tromsø Municipality in Troms og Finnmark county, Norway. The tunnel links the island of Kvaløya to the mainland Malangshalvøya peninsula. Located along Norwegian County Road 858, the tunnel runs under Straumsfjorden between the village of Larseng (on Kvaløya) and the Balsnes area on the mainland. It is open to cyclists since fall 2013.

References

External links

Subsea tunnels in Norway
Road tunnels in Troms og Finnmark
Buildings and structures in Tromsø
2011 establishments in Norway
Tunnels completed in 2011
Toll tunnels in Norway
Roads within the Arctic Circle